Elections to Liverpool City Council were held on Wednesday 1 November 1882. One third of the council seats were up for election, the term of office of each councillor being three years.

Ten of the sixteen seats were uncontested.

After the election, the composition of the council was:

Election result

Ward results

* - Retiring Councillor seeking re-election

Abercromby

Castle Street

Everton

Exchange

Great George

Lime Street

North Toxteth

Pitt Street

Rodney Street

St. Anne Street

St. Paul's

St. Peter's

Scotland

South Toxteth

Vauxhall

West Derby

By-elections

No.2, Scotland, 7 August 1883

Caused by the death of Councillor Patrick de Lacy Garton (Irish Home Rule, Scotland, elected 1 November 1880 – 1881)

Aldermanic By Election, 18 September 1883

Alderman John Weightman died on 5 August 1883.

Former Councillor Robert Vining (Conservative, Everton, elected 1 November 1876)

was elected as an alderman by the Council (Councillors and Aldermen) on 18 September 1883.

See also

 Liverpool City Council
 Liverpool Town Council elections 1835 - 1879
 Liverpool City Council elections 1880–present
 Mayors and Lord Mayors of Liverpool 1207 to present
 History of local government in England

References

1882
1882 English local elections
November 1882 events
1880s in Liverpool